Leptostylopsis thomasi is a species of longhorn beetle in the subfamily Lamiinae. It is native to Haiti and the Dominican Republic on the island of Hispaniola. It was described by Lingafelter and Micheli in 2009.

References

Acanthocinini
Beetles described in 2009
Insects of Haiti
Insects of the Dominican Republic